J. and E. Baker Cobblestone Farmstead is a historic home located at Macedon in Wayne County, New York.  The Gothic Revival style, cobblestone farmhouse consists of a -story, five-by-three-bay, rectangular main block with a 1-story side ell. It was built about 1850 and is constructed of nearly perfectly round, medium-sized, lake-washed cobbles. The house is among the approximately 170 surviving cobblestone buildings in Wayne County.

It was listed on the National Register of Historic Places in 1995.

References

Houses on the National Register of Historic Places in New York (state)
Gothic Revival architecture in New York City
Cobblestone architecture in New York (state)
Houses completed in 1850
Houses in Wayne County, New York
National Register of Historic Places in Wayne County, New York